Porębski is a Polish surname. Notable people with the surname include:

Jerzy Porębski (born 1956), Polish director
Kazimierz Porębski (1872–1933), Polish naval officer
Olgierd Porebski (1922-1995), British fencer
Przemysław Porębski (born 1998), Polish footballer
Tomasz Porębski (born 1980), Polish rally driver
Tomasz Porębski (footballer), Polish footballer

Polish-language surnames